"Ain't That a Groove" is a song written by James Brown and Nat Jones. Brown recorded it in 1965 with the female vocal group The Jewels and a studio band arranged and conducted by Sammy Lowe. Released in edited form as a two-part single in 1966, it charted #6 R&B and #42 Pop. The unedited studio recording of the song was included in the 1991 box set Star Time.

Cash Box described the single as a "rhythmic, throbbing chorus-backed romancer about a lucky twosome who seem aptly suited to each other."

Brown performs a live version of "Ain't That a Groove" on his 1967 album Live at the Garden He also performed the song live with his vocal group The Famous Flames on a 1966 telecast of the Ed Sullivan Show with The Jewels singing background offstage.

The single was also featured in Dead Presidents.

References

James Brown songs
Songs written by James Brown
1966 singles
1966 songs
King Records (United States) singles